Fiji's four coups in the past two decades have had church involvement. At the center of each coup lies the tension between the ethnic Fijians and Indian Fijians. Religion plays a significant role, as the majority of ethnic Fijians belong to the Methodist church while the majority of Indian Fijians are Hindu.

In each of the four coups, one of the sides sought to reduce rights for Indian Fijians, whereas the other side sought to grant equality to Indian Fijians. The coup by Colonel Sitiveni Rabuka in 1987 led to a constitution that ensured Indian Fijians could only have less than half of all seats in parliament and banned Indians from the post of prime minister. The coup of 2000, by George Speight, removed the elected Prime Minister Mahendra Chaudry, who is a Hindu of Indian origin.

Interference of Methodist Church in politics 

The powerful Methodist Church backed the past three coups, but has opposed the 2006 coup.

The Church plays a major role in Fiji politics. Oftentimes, some politicians appeal to Fijians addressing them as "Christians", even though Hindus are 38% of the 
population in Fiji, compared with 52% Christians. It was alleged by Commodore Frank Bainimarama that the 2000 Fijian coup d'état that removed the elected PM Mahendra Chaudhry, was supported by many people within Methodist church. The Methodist church leaders supported a subsequent proposal to pardon those involved.

There are some people within the Methodist church that have raised the possibility of declaring Fiji a theocratic Christian state. This has brought Josaia Voreqe "Frank" Bainimarama, leader of the December 2006 coup, into conflict with the Methodist church in the past.

Church's aim of establishing a Christian state in Fiji

Some Methodist Church authorities have continued to advocate the establishment of a Christian state. In a letter of support from the head of the Methodist Church, Reverend Tomasi Kanilagi, to George Speight, the leader of the May 19, 2000, armed takeover of Parliament,  Reverend Kanilagi publicly expressed his intention to use the Methodist Church as a forum under which to unite all ethnic Fijian political parties. The Methodist church also supported forgiveness to those who plotted the coup in form of so-called "Reconciliation, Tolerance, and Unity Bill".

Persecution of Hindus

The Methodist church general secretary Reverend Ame Tugaue has expressed concern about the practice of Hinduism in Fiji. Fiji Times reported his views on March 27, 2005:

"Because if God does get angry with the heathens, Christians will be punished because they allowed the worship of idols and other lesser gods in Fiji.  Sodom and Gomorrah were only destroyed after the Lord removed the faithful from there and not because of a few would we allow God's wrath to befall the whole of Fiji. It was clearly stated in the 10 Commandments that God gave to Moses that Christians were not allowed to worship any other gods and not to worship idols."

Reverend Tuikilakila Waqairatu of the Fiji Council of Churches and Assembly of Christian Churches has stated that the 2006 coup is "un-Christian" and is "[a] manifestation of darkness and evil" and pointed out that "52% of Fijians are Christian and the country's Christian values are being undermined".

Exodus of Indians from Fiji

Fiji is one of the few countries in the world that officially imposes disabilities on a group that constitutes a large part of the population, on the basis of race, and religion. It has caused an exodus of the Indians, who until recently formed slight majority in Fiji.

See also
 George Speight
 Methodist church sex abuse cases
 Military–church relations in Fiji 
 Reconciliation, Tolerance, and Unity Bill
 Religious reaction to the Reconciliation, Tolerance, and Unity Bill
 Persecution of Hindu minority in Fiji by Methodist Christian majority

References

External links
 Declare Fiji Christian state: Nationalists
  THE  CHURCH  AND  FIJIAN  ETHNOCENTRISM- An Adventure in Religious History and Sociology, Kevin J. Barr, 2004

History of Fiji
Christianity in Fiji
Religion and politics
Anti-Indian sentiment
Anti-Hindu sentiment